Ethotoin (previously marketed as Peganone) is an anticonvulsant drug used in the treatment of epilepsy. It is a hydantoin, similar to phenytoin. It is not available in the United States.

Mechanism of action

Similar to phenytoin.

Approval history
1957 Peganone was granted Food and Drug Administration (FDA) approval to Abbott Laboratories for treatment of grand mal (tonic clonic) and partial complex (psychomotor) seizures.
2003 Peganone was acquired from Abbott Laboratories by Ovation Pharmaceuticals (specialty pharmaceutical company who acquire underpromoted branded pharmaceutical products).
2018 It was announced by Recordati Rare Diseases Inc. that due to a combination of low product demand and complex manufacturing difficulties, product manufacturing, distribution and sale was being discontinued.

Indications and usage
Ethotoin is indicated for tonic-clonic and partial complex seizures.

Dosing
Ethotoin is available in 250 mg tablets. It is taken orally in 4 to 6 divided doses per day, preferably after food.

Side effects
Ataxia, visual disturbances, rash and gastrointestinal problems.

Chemistry
Ethotoin, 3-ethyl-5-phenylimidazolidine-2,4-dione, is synthesized by the reaction of benzaldehyde oxynitrile, with urea or ammonium hydrocarbonate, which forms an intermediate urea derivative which on acidic conditions cyclizes to 5-phenylhydantoin. Alkylation of this product using ethyliodide leads to the formation
of ethotoin.

References
 
 
 Drugs.com: Ethotoin
 PEGANONE 250 mg Ethotoin Tablets, USP (PDF)

External links
 Ovation Pharmaceuticals

Anticonvulsants
Hydantoins
AbbVie brands